Kwilu may refer to
 Kwilu River, a river in Angola and the Democratic Republic of the Congo, tributary of the Kwango River near its confluence with the Kasai River near Bandundu
 Kwilu River, a river in Angola and at the border with the Democratic Republic of the Congo, tributary of the Kwango River near Popokabaka
 Kwilu River, a river in Angola and the Democratic Republic of the Congo, tributary of the Congo River in Mayombe
 Kwilu dynasty, a ruling family in the Kingdom of Kongo
 Kwilu Province, a province of the Democratic Republic of the Congo
 Kwilu Ngongo, a town in the Democratic Republic of the Congo near the Angolan border
 Nsi Kwilu, the region along the Kwilu River
 Kouilou-Niari River, a river in the Republic of the Congo